Vivian Faye McNeill is an American atmospheric chemist who is Professor of Chemical Engineering at Columbia University. She leads the University's initiative Clean Air Toolbox for Cities. McNeill provided expert guidance on aerosols and ventilation throughout the COVID-19 pandemic.

Early life and education 
McNeill was an undergraduate student in chemical engineering at the California Institute of Technology. During her undergraduate degree. she became interested in aerosol science, watching the smog above the San Gabriel Mountains. McNeill suffered from asthma, and became increasingly aware of how much science could advance environmental policy and public health. She moved to the Massachusetts Institute of Technology for doctoral research, where she worked as a NASA Earth System Science Fellow. Her doctoral advisor was Mario Molina, the Nobel laureate who predicted that chlorofluorocarbons depleted stratospheric ozone.

Research and career 
McNeill joined Columbia University in 2007 and was awarded tenure in 2014. Her research looked to understand the interactions of trace gases with ice and snow. These interactions can be used to better predict how climate change will impact the composition of the atmosphere. The findings can also be used to understand ice core chemical records.

McNeill is interested in atmospheric aerosols and their role of atmospheric chemistry. Her research combines computational modelling with field work and lab-based experimental investigations. Air pollution is responsible for at least 6.7 million premature deaths a year. McNeill leads Clean Air Toolbox for Cities (CAToolbox), an interdisciplinary program that collects information about air quality in Africa, India and Indonesia.

During the COVID-19 pandemic, McNeill provided guidance about aerosols and ventilation to the general public.

Awards and honors 
 2009 ACS Petroleum Research Fund Doctoral New Investigator
 2009 National Science Foundation CAREER Award
 2015 American Association for Aerosol Research Kenneth T. Whitby Award
 2018 Mellichamp Emerging Leaders Lecturer

Selected publications

References 

Living people
Year of birth missing (living people)
California Institute of Technology alumni
Massachusetts Institute of Technology alumni
Columbia University faculty
American chemical engineers
21st-century American scientists